Lindsay Percival Duthie  is a former senior Australian public servant, best known for his time as Secretary of the Department of Primary Industry, between 1980 and 1986.

Life and career
Lindsay Duthie was born in the early 1930s in Wiluna, Western Australia.

He joined the Commonwealth Public Service in 1951 in the Department of Trade and Customs.  In 1976, he was appointed Deputy Secretary in the Department of Trade and Resources.

Duthie was appointed Secretary of the Department of Primary Industry in April 1980.

In 1986, in the departmental reshuffle, Duthie was removed as head of the Primary Industry Department, going on to become Special Trade Representative of Australia to Europe between 1986 and 1990.

Awards
Duthie was appointed a Member of the Order of Australia in January 1992, in recognition of his service to international trade.

References

Living people
Year of birth missing (living people)
Australian public servants
Members of the Order of Australia
People from Wiluna, Western Australia
1930s births